Jurnalo (jurnalo.com) was an automated news aggregator.

Jurnalo crawls articles from hundreds of English and German news publishers.
The composition of Jurnalo's homepage and its ranking of articles are determined by completely automated algorithms.
According to Jurnalo, its ranking of articles is updated every two minutes and is based on each article's publication date, relevance and journalistic quality.

Jurnalo's features include:

- Ranked clusters of top headlines

- News search

- Author-search and author-subscriptions

- Creation of individual topics by users

The website's name, 'jurnalo', is derived from the Esperanto translation of the word 'newspaper'. Jurnalo has been free of charge since its creation.

In November 2008, Jurnalo was the first news aggregator in the world to offer author-based search.

External links 
"Links für Europa", article by Die Tageszeitung, 2006-06-16. 

News aggregators
European news websites